Monobe  (物部) is the name of two former towns in Japan:
 Monobe, Kochi in Kochi Prefecture (now Kami, Kochi)
 Monobe, Tochigi in Tochigi Prefecture (now Ninomiya, Tochigi)